The International Right of Way Association (IRWA) is considered the central authority for right of way education and certification programs, as well as professional services, worldwide. 

The IRWA headquarters is located in Gardena, California, in the South Bay area of Los Angeles.

October is Right of Way month in the United States.

History 
IRWA was started in 1934 by Frank C. Balfour, a right of way agent employed by the California Division of Highways (now CalTrans) in Los Angeles, California. Originally named the Southern California Right of Way Agent’s Association, the first meeting was attended by fourteen right of way professionals, and was held on October 16, 1934, in Los Angeles.

The association was renamed the American Right of Way Association in 1935 and again in 1980, when it became the International Right of Way Association.

In 1986, IRWA joined with eight other leading professional appraisal organizations in the United States and Canada, including the Appraisal Foundation to form the Ad Hoc Committee on the USPAP (Uniform Standards of Professional Appraisal Practice).

Organization 

As of 2016, the IRWA comprises 10 regions that are divided into over 70 chapters all across the world, including United States, Canada, Saudi Arabia, South Africa, Nigeria, Mexico and Australia. The association has additional at-large members in China, Germany, South Korea, Georgia, Thailand, Japan, Namibia, The Netherlands, Uganda, the United Arab Emirates and the United Kingdom. Each region has a chair and vice chair that serve as IRWA officers and are elected by the IRWA board of directors. Each region holds two forums annually—one in the fall and one in the spring—and also conducts caucuses at IRWA's Annual International Education Conference.

IRWA annually forms several committees and communities to accomplish its goals and objectives. The association provides funding for the committee chairs and vice chairs. Chairs are appointed by the current IRWA president with the approval of the balance of the IEC. Committees and communities of practice are divided into three areas: service committees, industry committees and discipline communities of practice.

International Service Committees

These are designed to provide input into the key management functions of the association.

 Ethics
 Nominations & Elections
 The Partnership for Infrastructure Professional Education
 Credentialing
 Finance

International Industry Committees

These focus on issues impacting the disciplines and industries associated with the right of way profession.

 Utilities Electric & Utilities
 International Public Agencies
 Oil & Gas Pipeline
 Transportation

Communities of Practice

These focus on issues related to the industries IRWA serves.

 Asset Management
 Environment
 Relocation
 Surveying and Engineering
 Valuation

Leadership 
At the top of IRWA's leadership structure is the International Executive Committee (IEC) and the International Governing Council (IGC), which comprises the IEC and the 10 region chairs.

The IEC is composed of an elected International President, International President-Elect, International Vice President International Treasurer and International Secretary as well as the association's Executive Vice President, International General Counsel and Staff Liaison. The Executive Vice President and General Counsel have a voice but no vote in the deliberations of the IEC.

IRWA's 2016-2017 international president is Mary Anne Marr, SR/WA.

Advisory council 
IRWA's past international presidents make up an advisory council of active leaders who remain current and engage on IRWA education and service committees, in addition to chairing and serving on special project groups. Below is a list of all of IRWA's past presidents and their tenures served.

* Deceased

Board of directors 
IRWA's board of directors is composed of representatives from all 74 chapters and 10 regions, as well as all members of the IEC, and is tasked with overseeing the policies and strategic planning of the association. The board meets annually at the International Education Conference to review association financial reports and budgets, consider and vote on any resolutions, and also elect new international officers.

Partners 
As part of the association's strategic initiatives to create a right of way community and facilitate collaboration, IRWA has established a partnership with foundations, consulting companies, public agencies, sponsors, other associations and affiliates.

Public agency partners 
 Federal Aviation Administration
 Federal Transit Administration
 U.S. Army Corps of Engineers
 Federal Highway Administration
 U.S. Bureau of Land Management
 U.S. Department of Housing and Urban Development

Association partners 
 Appraisal Institute
 FIABCI - The International Real Estate Federation
 NSPS - National Society of Professional Surveyors
 NAIFA - National Association of Independent Fee Appraisers
 ASFMRA - American Society of Farm Managers and Rural Appraisers

Affiliates 
 Japanese Consultants Council
 Compulsory Purchase Association - United Kingdom
 Institute for Underground Infrastructure - Germany

Consultants 
 Right of Way Consultants Council
 
IRWA is also a sponsoring organization of the Appraisal Foundation.

Members 
IRWA has over 10,000 professional members worldwide who are a group of multi-disciplined professionals employed by private industries and government agencies, including acquisition agents, project managers, appraisers, environmental specialists, engineers, property disposition professionals, real estate attorneys, property managers, relocation assistance agents, surveyors, title expert and utility employees.

Education 
IRWA's education and training programs provide a foundation for right of way professionals across the United States and Canada in all right of way disciplines: negotiation and acquisition, management, appraisal, relocation assistance, environmental, asset/property management, real estate law, engineering and surveying.

Credentialing 
IRWA offers two career paths for right of way professionals: a generalist path and a specialist path, both of which can be achieved by taking IRWA educational courses.   IRWA's premier designation, the SR/WA Senior Right of Way Professional, is the highest designation available to right of way professionals.

Generalist path 
IRWA has three levels of certification and one designation for the generalist right of way professional:

 Right of Way Agent Certification (RWA)
 Right of Way Professional Certification (RWP)
 SR/WA Designation

Specialist path 
IRWA has six discipline certifications and one designation for the specialist right of way professional:

 R/W-AC Appraisal Certification
 R/W-AMC Asset/Property Management Certification
 R/W-NAC Negotiation and Acquisition Certification
 R/W-RAC Relocation Assistance Certification
 R/W-URAC Uniform Act Certification

Retired certifications

ARWP Associate Right of Way Professional

R/W-EC Right of Way Environmental

Foundations 
IRWA has two education foundations, the Right of Way International Education Foundation (RWIEF)  and the Canadian Right of Way Education Foundation(CRWEF), which were established for the primary purpose of funding right of way education initiatives. They were founded under the belief that continuing education and professional development are essential to the growth and advancement of the right of way profession. The foundation focuses on generating financial contributions and determining how to best allocate those funds on behalf of the right of way profession.

The Right of Way International Education Foundation and the Canadian Right of Way Education Foundation each provide funding for the development of IRWA education programming.

Annual International Education Conference 

Each year, the IRWA holds its Annual International Education Conference at a different Chapter host site, which is attended by over 1,000 right of way professionals from all over the world who meet in one location to partake in educational sessions, network with other professionals, complete courses for credit toward a certification or designation, and showcase services at the Expo event.

The host site is typically voted on five years in advance at the IRWA Board of Directors meeting during the last day of the Conference.

The IRWA also hosts its Annual Awards Luncheon ceremony on the Monday afternoon at the Conference where it recognizes individuals, companies and IRWA chapters who have made valuable contributions towards advancing the right of way profession. In addition, the IRWA recognizes all of its members who have received the SR/WA designation after the preceding Conference at the SR/WA Breakfast ceremony, which is held on the Tuesday morning of the Conference.

Right of Way Magazine 
IRWA's publication, Right of Way Magazine, has an international audience of professionals employed by private industry and government agencies. Recognized as the voice of the Right of Way Profession, the bimonthly magazine features noteworthy infrastructure projects, industry updates and valuable information affecting all facets of right of way. Editorial contributors are experts in appraisal, engineering, environmental, relocation, surveying, transportation, asset management, land acquisition and real estate law.

References

External links 
 

Real estate valuation
Real estate-related professional associations
Companies based in Los Angeles County, California
Gardena, California